Louis Garner (born 31 October 1994) is an English footballer. He is a midfielder who made three substitute appearances in Football League One for Coventry City in 2013–14. He was released by the club at the end of that season.

Career
Garner made his professional debut as a substitute on 5 October 2013 in a 1-0 Football League One win over Stevenage, coming on to replace the injured Cyrus Christie after 87 minutes.

Career statistics
Stats according to Soccerbase

References

External links
Louis Garner player profile at ccfc.co.uk

1994 births
Living people
English footballers
Footballers from Manchester
Association football midfielders
Coventry City F.C. players
English Football League players